John Becht (October 13, 1886 – November 7, 1960) was an American cyclist. He competed in two events at the 1912 Summer Olympics.

He died at his home in New Milford, New Jersey on November 7, 1960.

References

External links
 

1886 births
1960 deaths
American male cyclists
Olympic cyclists of the United States
Cyclists at the 1912 Summer Olympics
Sportspeople from Brooklyn